Tom Froese (born November 29, 1952) is a former politician in Ontario, Canada. He served as a Progressive Conservative member of the Legislative Assembly of Ontario from 1995 to 1999 who represented the riding of St. Catharines—Brock.

Background
Froese was born in Niagara-on-the-Lake, Ontario, where his father Jake Froese would later serve as the town's mayor and as a federal Member of Parliament. He worked at Niagara Credit Union from 1971 to 1995, and served in several other local organizations. In 1991, he was named as Niagara-on-the-Lake citizen of the year.

Politics
Froese was elected to the Ontario legislature in the 1995 provincial election, defeating Liberal Gail Richardson and New Democrat incumbent Christel Haeck by a plurality of about 4,500 votes in the riding of St. Catharines—Brock.  He served as a backbench supporter of Mike Harris's government for the next four years.

In 1996, the Harris government reduced the number of provincial ridings from 130 to 103. This change meant that a number of sitting MPPs had to compete against one another for re-election in the 1999 campaign. Froese ran against veteran Liberal MPP Jim Bradley in the new riding of St. Catharines, and lost by over 7,000 votes.

References

External links
 

1952 births
Living people
People from Niagara-on-the-Lake
Progressive Conservative Party of Ontario MPPs